The 2014–15 National League B season was the 68th ice hockey season of Switzerland's second tier hockey league, the National League B

Teams

Regular season
Final standings.

Playoffs

League Qualification

Lakers vs. SCL Tigers

SCL Tigers won the series and were promoted to NLA and will play there in 2015–16 season. Rapperswil-Jona Lakers were relegated to National League B and will play there in 2015–16 season.

References

External links
  National League B, official website
  National League B, official website
  National League B, hockeyarchives

National League B seasons
2014–15 in Swiss ice hockey
Swiss